Salem (also Brooklyn) is a community in the village of Salem Lakes, Kenosha County, Wisconsin, United States. Salem has a post office with ZIP code 53168.

References

Populated places in Kenosha County, Wisconsin
Neighborhoods in Wisconsin